This is a complete filmography of the Mexican actress Dolores del Río. She was a Hollywood star in the 1920s and 1930s, and one of the most important figures of the Golden Age of Mexican cinema in the 1940s and 1950s. During the 1920s and 1930s in Hollywood, she was considered one of the most beautiful women of the cinema. Her career flourished with success in films such as Resurrection (1927), Ramona (1928), Evangeline (1929), Bird of Paradise (1932), Flying Down to Rio (1933), Madame Du Barry, Wonder Bar (1934) and Journey into Fear (1942).
When del Río returned to Mexico in the early 1940s, she became the most important female star of the Golden Age of Mexican cinema. Films like Wild Flower (1943), María Candelaria (1943), Las abandonadas (1944), Bugambilia (1944) and La Malquerida (1949), are considered among the great classics of the Mexican cinema..

With the decline of Mexican cinema during the sixties, Dolores del Río opted for work in theatre. She starred in successful stage  projects in her native country. She also participated in some American TV series in the 1950s and 1960s. Her film appearances during the 1960s and 1970s were sporadic. She remained active in entertainment until the early 1980s.

Filmography

1925 – 1929

1930 – 1942

1943 – 1959

1960 – 1978

Short films appearing as herself

Documentary

Television

Theatre

Awards

Honorary awards

External links 
 
 
 
Dolores del Río filmography at the Cinema of Mexico site of the ITESM 

Actress filmographies
Mexican filmographies